Congleton is a town and civil parish in the unitary authority of Cheshire East in Cheshire, England. At the 2011 Census, it had a population of 26,482.

Toponymy
The town's name is of unknown origin.  The first recorded reference to it was in 1282, when it was spelt Congelton. The element Congle might relate to the old Norse kang meaning a bend, followed by the Old English element tun meaning settlement.

History
The first settlements in the Congleton area were Neolithic. Stone Age and Bronze Age artefacts have been found in the town. Congleton was once thought to have been a Roman settlement, although there is no archaeological or documentary evidence to support this. Congleton became a market town after Vikings destroyed nearby Davenport.

Godwin, Earl of Wessex held the town in the Saxon period. The town is mentioned in the Domesday Book, where it is listed as Cogeltone: Bigot de Loges. William the Conqueror granted the whole of Cheshire to his nephew the Earl of Chester who constructed several fortifications including the town's castle in 1208. In the 13th century, Congleton belonged to the de Lacy family. Henry de Lacy, 3rd Earl of Lincoln granted the town its first charter in 1272, enabling it to hold fairs and markets, elect a mayor and ale taster, have a merchant guild and behead known criminals.

In 1451, the River Dane flooded, destroying a number of buildings, the town's mill and wooden bridge. The river was diverted, and the town was rebuilt on higher ground.

Congleton became known in the 1620s when bear-baiting and cockfighting were popular sports. The town was unable to attract large crowds to its bear-baiting contests and lacked the money to pay for a new, more aggressive bear. A legend tells that Congleton spent the money they were going to spend on a bible on a bear, this legend is only partly true as only part of the fund to buy a new bible was used to buy a new bear. The legend earned Congleton the nickname Beartown. The chorus of 20th-century folk song "Congleton Bear", by folk artist John Tams, runs:
Congleton Rare, Congleton Rare
Sold the Bible to buy a bear.

During the Civil War, former mayor and lawyer John Bradshaw became president of the court which sent Charles I to his execution in 1649. His signature as Attorney General was the first on the king's death warrant. A plaque on Bradshaw House in Lawton Street commemorates him. Almost opposite the town hall, the White Lion public house bears a blue plaque, placed by the Congleton Civic Society, which reads: "The White Lion, built 16–17th century. Said to have housed the attorney's office where John Bradshaw, regicide, served his articles."

King Edward I granted permission to build a mill. Congleton became an important centre of textile production, especially leather gloves and lace. Congleton had an early silk throwing mill, the Old Mill built by John Clayton and Nathaniel Pattison in 1753. More mills followed, and cotton was also spun. The town's prosperity depended on tariffs imposed on imported silk. When tariffs were removed in the 1860s, the empty mills were converted to fustian cutting. A limited silk ribbon weaving industry survived into the 20th century, and woven labels were still produced in the 1990s. Many mills survive as industrial or residential units.

Congleton Town Hall was designed in the Gothic style by Edward William Godwin. It was completed in 1866.

The current hospital in Congleton was opened by the Duke of York on 22 May 1924.

Congleton elected its first Lady Mayor in November 1945.

During the celebration marking 700 years of Congleton's Charter in 1972 Queen Elizabeth II and Prince Philip visited Congleton in May, this was the first visit by a reigning monarch since the visit of King George V and Queen Mary in 1913.

As part of the celebration marking 750 years of Congleton's charter Congleton appointed an Ale Taster.

Governance
The Congleton parliamentary constituency is a county constituency represented in the House of Commons of the Parliament of the United Kingdom. It includes the towns of Congleton, Alsager, Holmes Chapel, Middlewich and Sandbach. It elects one Member of Parliament (MP) by the first-past-the-post system of election. The current MP is Fiona Bruce of the Conservative Party, the previous incumbent was Ann Winterton, who sat in parliament alongside her husband Nicholas Winterton, the MP for neighbouring Macclesfield. After they were judged to have broken MPs' expense rules in 2008 by claiming for rent on a second home owned by a family trust, both stood down at the 2010 general election; their joint statement cited the hectic life of politics as part of their reason for standing down.

Congleton forms the central portion of the Cheshire East unitary authority, located in the south-east of Cheshire. Before the abolition of Cheshire County Council on 1 April 2009, Congleton had borough status (originally conferred in 1272). The neighbouring urban district  of Buglawton was incorporated into Congleton borough in 1936. From 1974 to 2009, Congleton borough covered much of south-east Cheshire.

For representation on Cheshire East Council, Congleton divided into two wards returning three members, Congleton East and Congleton West. Three of the six seats are currently represented by Conservative Party Councillors, with one Liberal Democrat and two Independents.

The town has an elected Town Council which was established in 1980. The town is split into two wards with 20 councillors elected every 4 years.

Geography

Mossley is sometimes classed as the wealthier part of town. Hightown is located in Mossley. West Heath is an estate built in the early 1960s to the early 1980s. Lower Heath lies to the north of the town. There is also the town centre.

Congleton is in the valley of the River Dane. South of the town lies an expanse of green space known locally as Priesty Fields which forms a green corridor right into the heart of the town – a rare feature in English towns. Folklore says that Priesty Fields gained its name as there was no priest performing services within the town. The nearest priest was based at the nearby village of Astbury. It is told that the priest would walk along an ancient medieval pathway which ran between the fields at the Parish Church in Astbury and St Peter's Church in Congleton.

Economy
The principal industries in Congleton include the manufacture of airbags and golf balls. There are light engineering factories near the town and sand extraction occurs on the Cheshire Plain.

One of the most prominent industries during the nineteenth century onwards was Berisfords Ribbons, established in 1858. It was founded by Charles Berisford and his brothers Francis and William. The brothers leased part of Victoria Mill, on Foundry Bank, owning the entire factory by 1872. By 1898, the company had offices in London, Manchester, Leeds and Bristol.

Congleton Market operates every Tuesday and Saturday from the Bridestones Centre.

Until about 2000, Super Crystalate balls, made of crystalate, were manufactured by The Composition Billiard Ball Company in Congleton. The company was then sold by its owner to Saluc S.A., the Belgian manufacturer of Aramith Balls. The name Super Crystalate was retained, but the manufacturing process was integrated into the standard process used for Aramith balls.

Culture

Congleton Park is located along the banks of the River Dane, just north-east of the town centre. Town Wood, on the northern edge of the park, is a Grade A Site of Biological Interest and contains many nationally important plants. Congleton Paddling Pool was built in the 1930s and is open in the summer months. Astbury Mere Country Park lies just to the south-west of the town centre, on the site of a former sand quarry. The lake is used for fishing and sailing and, despite its name, is actually in the West Heath area of Congleton, with the boundary between Congleton and Newbold Astbury parishes lying further to the south.

The independently run 300 seat Daneside Theatre is on Park Road. Founded in 1971, Congleton Choral Society is a mixed voice choir which regularly performs choral works at Congleton Town Hall and other venues around the town.

Congleton Museum is on Market Square, in the centre of town. It was established in 2002 and is dedicated to Congleton's industrial history. It also contains an ancient log boat and gold and silver coin hoards. Congleton Tourist Information Centre is on the town's High Street.

The town also annually hosts a food and drink festival, which promotes locally sourced produce/cuisine, with a jazz and blues festival which showcases acts from across the UK. In 2019, Congleton held its first annual pride event.

The town hosts a one-day carnival every two years. In the past the carnival was regarded as one of the best local carnivals in England, and used to last for up to three days and feature floats and live music among another attractions.

For six months in summer 2011 Congleton hosted an event called "Bearmania", in which over sixty 5-foot fibreglass sculptures where placed around the town. Over 26,000 people came to see the bears during "Bearmania".

Media
There is one weekly local newspaper: the locally owned and financed Congleton Chronicle. The evening newspaper The Sentinel, based in Stoke-on-Trent, also covers the town although less so than in the past. Local radio is broadcast from nearby Macclesfield-based Silk FM, Signal 1 and Greatest Hits Radio Staffordshire & Cheshire from Stoke-on-Trent and BBC Radio Stoke. Community radio is provided by Moorlands Radio in Leek and Canalside Community Radio in Macclesfield.

Congleton did have its own community radio station Beartown FM, but this has now closed. There is an internet-only radio station, Congleton Radio, which started broadcasting on 25 June 2022.

Sport

Rugby union
Congleton is home to the third oldest rugby union club in the country, dating back to 1860. Currently fielding a mini and junior section and three adult sides, the club held the world record for the longest continuous game of rugby ever played, at 24 hours, 30 minutes and 6 seconds. The club has also pioneered the development of 'walking rugby' for more senior players and has re-established a ladies' team, having previously had two of its women players represent England.

Football
The local football team, Congleton Town F.C., known as the Bears, play in the North West Counties League. Their ground is at Booth Street.

Tennis 
Congleton Tennis Club, one of the oldest in the country (founded in 1890), have occupied the same grounds throughout their history. The club has nine courts: six all-weather courts and three with artificial grass. Four of the courts are floodlit.

Other sports
There are two cricket clubs, Congleton CC and Mossley CC. There are two golf clubs in the town—the historic Congleton Golf Club, which is an undulating nine-hole course with views over the Cloud End, and the 18-hole parkland course at Astbury. There is also a running club, Congleton Harriers, which meets weekly at Congleton Leisure Centre. The club organises the Congleton Half Marathon and in 2012 re-introduced the Congleton Quarter Marathon.

Transport

Railway

Congleton railway station was opened by the North Staffordshire Railway on 9 October 1848. It is situated on the Stafford-Manchester spur of the West Coast Main Line. There is generally an hourly stopping service between Manchester Piccadilly and Stoke-on-Trent, fewer on Sundays, with trains operated by Northern.

The Biddulph Valley line used to terminate in the town. The railway ran from Stoke-on-Trent to Brunswick Wharf, in the suburb of Buglawton. Passenger services ended in 1927, with freight services continuing until 1968 when the line was closed.

Busses
Congleton has nine bus routes Monday to Saturday only operated by Arriva North West, D&G and Hollinshead coaches.

Roads
It is on the A34 trunk road between Stoke-on-Trent and Manchester, and the A54 to Buxton and the Peak District. The A536 links the town with Macclesfield, with the A527 linking the town to Biddulph and providing an alternative route to Stoke-on-Trent.

Waterways
The Macclesfield Canal, completed in 1831, passes through the town. It runs  from Marple Junction at Marple, where it joins the Upper Peak Forest Canal, southwards (through Bollington and Macclesfield), before arriving at Bosley. Having descended the 12 Bosley Locks over the course of about a mile (1.6 km), the canal continues through Congleton to a junction with the Hall Green Branch of the Trent & Mersey Canal at Hall Green. The canal is renowned for its elegant roving bridges. Congleton is one of few places in Britain where a road, canal and railway all cross each other at the same place.

Air

Public services
Policing in Congleton is provided by Cheshire Constabulary. The main police station is on Market Square.

Statutory emergency fire and rescue service is provided by the Cheshire Fire and Rescue Service. Congleton Fire Station is on West Road, near the centre of town.

Congleton has a small Non-Accident and Emergency hospital, Congleton War Memorial Hospital, which was built by public subscription in 1924. The town is also served by Leighton Hospital in Crewe, Macclesfield District General Hospital and the University Hospital of North Staffordshire in Stoke-on-Trent.

Religion

The four Anglican churches in Congleton (forming a partnership in the All Saints Congleton parish) are:
 St John's
 St Stephen's
 St Peter's
 Trinity

Congleton Town Council lists eleven other places of worship in the town:
 Congleton Community Baptist Church
 Brookhouse Green Methodist Church
 New Life Church
 Congleton Pentecostal Church
 Rood Lane Methodist Church
 Congleton Spiritualist Church
 St James' Anglican Church
 St Mary's Roman Catholic Church
 Trinity Methodist Church
 Congleton United Reformed Church
 Wellspring Methodist Church
 The Church of Jesus Christ of Latter-day Saints (Mormons)

Historically, Congleton has seen a wide range of Christian church denominations.

 The Friends' Meeting House closed in 1741.
 The Wesleyan Methodist Trinity Chapel, in Wagg Street, was founded in 1766 and was rebuilt in 1808 and again in 1967; the Primitive Methodist Chapel was built in 1821 on Lawton Street, and rebuilt in 1890 on Kinsey Street; the Countess of Huntingdon's Connexion Methodist chapel was founded in 1822; the Congleton Edge Wesleyan Methodist Chapel was built in 1833 and rebuilt in 1889; the Wesleyan Methodist Chapel in Brook Street was built in 1834; the New Connexion Methodist Chapel in Queen Street was built in 1836 and closed in 1969; the Primitive Methodist Chapel in Biddulph Road was built in 1840; the Wesleyan Methodist Chapel in Rood Lane was founded in 1861 and rebuilt in 1886.
 The Unitarian Chapel in Cross Street was founded in 1687 near the Dane Bridge and in 1733 moved to Cross Street, with the present building constructed in 1883 and closed in 1978. 
 The United Reformed Church (Independent/Congregationalist) was built in 1790 on Mill Street, and then rebuilt in 1876 on Antrobus Street.

Education

Primary schools
Astbury St Mary's C of E School
Black Firs Primary School
Buglawton Primary School
Daven Primary School
Havannah Primary School
Marlfields Primary School
Mossley C of E Primary School
Smallwood C of E Primary School
St Mary's Catholic Primary School
The Quinta Primary School

High and secondary schools
Congleton High School
Eaton Bank Academy

Notable people

Public service and commerce 
 Saint Margaret Ward (died 1588), the "pearl of Tyburn", English Catholic martyr executed during the reign of Elizabeth I for assisting a priest to escape from prison
 John Bradshaw (1602–1659), judge, sat as President of the High Court of Justice for the trial of King Charles I, Mayor of Congleton 1637–1638
 John Whitehurst FRS (1713–1788), clockmaker and scientist, member of the Lunar Society
 Sir John Parnell, 2nd Baronet (1744–1801), Anglo-Irish Member of Parliament, his family originally migrated to Ireland from Congleton
 Robert Hodgson (1773–1844), priest,  Dean of Carlisle
 Gibbs Crawfurd Antrobus (1793–1861), diplomat and politician, long-established family in Congleton
 Hewett Watson (1804–1881), phrenologist, botanist and evolutionary theorist
 William Newton (1822–1876), trade unionist, journalist and Chartist
 Elizabeth Wolstenholme (1833–1918), suffragist, essayist and poet
 Rear-Admiral Gerald Cartmell Harrison (1883–1943), Royal Navy officer and cricketer
 Theodora Turner OBE ARRC (1907–1999), born in Congleton, nurse and hospital matron.
 Frank Kearton, Baron Kearton OBE FRS FRSA (1911–1992), life peer, scientist and industrialist
 George Harold Eardley VC MM (1912–1991), received the Victoria Cross in 1944
 John Blundell (1952–2014), Director General at the Institute of Economic Affairs
 Dawn Gibbins MBE (1961–2022) entrepreneur, started flooring company Flowcrete with her father.

Arts 
 Stanley Unwin (1911–2002), also "Professor" Stanley Unwin, comedian, actor and comic
 Alan Garner OBE (born 1934), novelist best known for his children's fantasy novels
 Louise Plowright (1956–2016), actress
 Mark Edwardson (born 1967), TV presenter, BBC North West lives in Congleton 
 Emma Bossons  (born 1976 in Congleton), ceramic artist and designer for Moorcroft Pottery
 Jackie Oates (born 1983 in Congleton), folk singer and fiddle player

Sports 
 Tommy Clare (1865–1929), international footballer (right-back) and football manager
 George Clawley (1875–1920), professional goalkeeper who played for Stoke City F.C., Southampton and Tottenham Hotspur, born at Scholar Green, near Congleton
 William Yates (1880–1967), racewalker, competed at the 1912 Summer Olympics
 Hugh Moffat (1885–1952), footballer, played for Burnley F.C. and Oldham Athletic F.C.
 Bill Fielding (1915–2006), goalkeeper for Cardiff City, Bolton Wanderers and Manchester United
 Ann Packer (born 1942) and Robbie Brightwell (1939–2022), husband-and-wife Olympic gold medal athletes
 Ian Brightwell (born 1968), former Manchester City footballer with 464 club caps; grew up in Congleton
 Laura Newton (born 1977), cricketer
 Tim Brown (born 1981), New Zealand international footballer, born in Congleton

Twin towns – sister cities 

Congleton is twinned with:
Trappes since 16 September 1962

Aldermen and Freeman 

The following is a list of people who have been either an Alderman or Freeman of Congleton, and when the title was bestowed.
A. J. Solly (Alderman ???)
Ernest Hancock (Alderman ???)
John Smith (Alderman ???)
Massie Harper (Alderman ???)
F. Dale (Alderman ???)
Harold Burns (Alderman ???)
W. I. Fern J.P. (Alderman ???)
S. Maskery (Alderman ???)
Fred Jackson (Alderman ???, Freeman ???)
Frederick Barton (???)
G. Rowell (November 1945)
W. Newton (November 1945)
W.F. O'Reilly (November 1945)
Mr C. W. Harrison (Alderman 4 October 1984)
Mr A. G. Smith (Alderman 4 October 1984)
Mr C. H. Kelly (Alderman 25 September 1986)
Mr L. Yarwood (Alderman 29 September 1988)
Mr J. M. Telfer (Alderman 28 September 1989)
Mr F. Bowers (Alderman 5 November 1992)
Mr. W. Vickers Q.P.M. (Alderman 5 November 1992)
Mrs E. Henshall MBE. BA. Dip.ed. (Alderman 22 September 1994)
Mr R. Tomlinson (Alderman 29 October 1998)
Mr R. C. Parry (Alderman 29 January 2004)
Mr K. A. Hemsley (Alderman 29 January 2004)
Mrs K. A. Thompson (Alderman 29 January 2004)
Mr M. J. Cooper (Alderman 2009)
Mr T. Farrell (Alderman 2009)
Mr R. A. Giltrap (Alderman 2009)
Mr L. Morris (Alderman 2009) 
MR F. Walton (Alderman 2009)
Cllr D. Brown (Alderman 2009) 
Cllr R. M. Domleo (Alderman 2009)
Cllr P. J. Edwards (Alderman 2009)
Cllr R. I. Fletcher (Alderman 2009)
Cllr D. I. Hough (Alderman 2009)
First Battalion of the Mercian Regiment (Freeman ???)
Mr G. Chambers (Freeman 2009)

Freedom of Congleton 
The following is a list of people who have had freedom of Congleton and when the freedom was bestowed.
Alderman S. Maskery (Freedom of the Borough of Congleton early 1900s)
DR. W.L. Fern (Freedom of the Borough of Congleton 14 May 1934)
Alderman W. I. Fern J.P. (Freedom of the Borough of Congleton  14 May 1934)

Gallery

See also

Listed buildings in Congleton

References

Notes

Sources

External links

Congleton Town Council website

Welcome to Congleton — dedicated tourism website for the Congleton area.
Congleton Museum — local history museum and education resource

 
Civil parishes in Cheshire
Towns in Cheshire